Neal Island is a bar island on the Ohio River in Wood County, West Virginia. The island lies directly offshore from the city of Vienna. A section of Neal Island is a part of the Ohio River Islands National Wildlife Refuge.

See also 
List of islands of West Virginia

References

River islands of West Virginia
Islands of Wood County, West Virginia
Islands of the Ohio River